Anterastria is a genus of moths of the family Noctuidae. The genus was erected by Shigero Sugi in 1982.

Species
Anterastria atrata (Butler, 1881) south-eastern Siberia, Korea, Japan
Anterastria teratophora (Herrich-Schäffer, [1854]) United States (Tennessee)

References

Noctuinae
Noctuoidea genera